Ivan Mandricenco (born 18 June 1965) is a Moldovan football coach and a former player.

See also
 Nicolae Mandrîcenco

References

1968 births
Living people
Soviet footballers
CS Tiligul-Tiras Tiraspol players
Moldovan footballers
FC Chernomorets Novorossiysk players
Moldovan expatriate footballers
Expatriate footballers in Russia
FC Kuban Krasnodar players
Russian Premier League players
FC Podillya Khmelnytskyi players
Expatriate footballers in Ukraine
FC Rapid Ghidighici players
Moldovan football managers
FC Tighina players

Association football midfielders
Association football defenders